Eucereon phaeoproctum is a moth of the subfamily Arctiinae. It was described by George Hampson in 1898. It is found in Guatemala, Costa Rica and Panama.

References

 

phaeoproctum
Moths described in 1898
Moths of Central America